CHM-081 (SGT-4) is a recreational designer drug which is classed as a synthetic cannabinoid. It is from the naphthoylindole family, being the 1-cyclohexylmethyl instead of 1-pentyl analogue of JWH-081, and produces cannabis-like effects. It has been identified as an ingredient in synthetic cannabis products in various countries including the USA and Australia.

See also 
 AB-CHMINACA
 CHM-018
 Org 28611

References 

Naphthoylindoles
Designer drugs
CB1 receptor agonists
CB2 receptor agonists
Cyclohexyl compounds
Methoxy compounds